Kondur or Kandoora is the largest village in the Sukhnag River valley, located on the eastern banks of the Sukhnag River.

Kandoora is a rural village, with agriculture its main economic activity. The overwhelming majority of its population is Muslim, and their first language is Koshur (Kashmiri), with other languages in use for particular purposes.

Etymology 
The village name, Kandoora, derives from two Kashmiri words: , {), and ,. As a whole, this gives the meaning, field of stones, and as the name suggests, the village of Kandoora does have plenty of stones in it.

History

Village administration
Kandoora is in the Beerwah subdivision of Budgam district, and governance of Kandoora is by representative democracy. The village is governed by a gram panchayat or village council, according to the 1996 Panchayats Act Its panchayat has eleven members, with each member representing a ward constituency. Each ward has its ward representative.

Geography
Kandoora is a rural village, one of 102 inhabited villages in the Beerwah tehsil.
Beerwah, along with Sodipora, lies to the north of Kandoora. Also neighbouring the village are the surrounding locations of Sonapah to the northeast; Rankipora and Khatiruna to the east; Larbal to the southeast; Peth Zanigaam and Latinae to the south; Sail and Bun Zanigaamin to the southwest; Kanigund in the west; and Goriepora and Gohlar to the northwest.

Village layout
Kandoora is internally divided into Neiber Kandoora (meaning, 'spread out' or 'peripheral'), and Gamander Kandoora (meaning, 'downtown' or 'central portion').

Neiber Kandoora has:

 Hajamabad 
 Najarabad
 Brandaker
 Gamudd
 Ghatpur
 Sheikhpur
 Malikpur

Gamander Kandoora is composed of:

 Bunpur
 Pethpur
 Mirpur (half)
 Hajamabad (half)
 Najarabad (half)
 Old Graveyard of Kandoora
 Masheed-e-Aungun (centre) 

There are several planned or specially built communities within Kandoora. Such communities are widely known as colonies within the subcontinent.
The Kandoorian colonies are: Zandwan; Sheikh ul Alam;  Gousia; and Larbal.

Village roads 
Roads interior to the village include:
 Ghatpur-Masheed e Aungun Street
 Diversion-Malikpur Street
 Diversion-Nagpur Street
 Sheikhpur-Batehar Street
 Gamudd-Maxelum Street
 Maxelumm-Aawrenea Street
 Batehar Street

Area road system 
Kandoora is well connected to its neighbouring villages by link road. The roads meet internally in the administrative centre, central Kandoora, locally called Masheed-e-Aungun.
The roads are:
 Kandoora-Larbal Link road - 
 Kandoora-Khatiruna Link road - 
 Kandoora-Latina Link Road -  
 Kandoora-Zaniegaam Link Road - 
 Kandoora-Rankipora Link Road - 
 Kandoora-Kaniegund Link Road - 
 Kandoora-Sail Link Road - 
 Kandoora-Sodiepora Link Road - 
 Kandoora-Arizal Road - 

The village can be accessed from:

 Budgam
 Budgam-Kandoora Road, via Sonpah
 Beerwah
 Beerwah-Doodhpathri Road, via Sonpah
 Beerwah-Kandoora Road, via Rankipora
 Khag
 Kandoora-Khag Road, via Malpora and Sail
 Khan Sahib
 Kandoora-Khan Sahib Road, via Pethkoot

Economy
The economy of Kandoora is generally agrarian, being derived from agriculture and horticultural produce. The horticultural sector is on the rise, with the help of Sher-e-Kashmir University of Agricultural Sciences and Technology of Jammu (SKUAST-J) and Sher-e-Kashmir University of Agricultural Sciences and Technology of Kashmir. Many apple orchards are being developed and this sector is expected to boost the local economy.

The production and sale of Kashmiri handicrafts, such as Kashmiri shawls, is another avenue for earning income available to Kandoorians.

People and culture 

The village population is almost wholly Muslim and includes adherents of Sunni Islam, schools of Hanafi, Salafism, and Barelvi branches or schools of Islam.

Disputes are usually brought before the local jirga to be resolved. The jirga is an assembly of local Kandoora chieftains. This traditional gathering of leaders has been adapted by Kashmiri Muslims from its origins in erstwhile North-West Frontier Province (NWFP) and Afghanistan.

The mother tongue of Kandoora locals is Koshur (Kashmiri). Several other languages are occasionally used, including Urdu, English, Persian, Arabic and Hindi.

Demographics 
The majority of adult Kandoora residents work in agriculture and its associated occupations. There are some government employees. Teenagers and young adults may continue as students, attending further education at institutions in the wider district.

Source: Census 2011 - 15th National census of India

Clans 
The clans living within Kandoora - without casteism  (caste prejudice) - include:

 Ahanger
 Chopan
 Ganiee
 Hajam
 Khan
 Magrey
 Malik
 Malla
 Mir
 Najar
 Pandit
 Parry
 Sheikh
 Syed
 Wani
 Zarger

Religious institutions and organisations 

The township has halqa level bodies of:

 Karwan-I-Islami International, Jammu and Kashmir
 Jamiat-e-Ahle Hadith, J&K, Jammu and Kashmir

The village has six masjids, including two jama masjids:
 Grand Jamia Hanafia, Kandoora (in central Masheed-e-Aungun area)
 Chanpur Masjid e Shareef (in Chanpur)
 Masjid e Ramzaan a mosque of the Hanafi school in Sheikhpur 
 Masjid e Gousiyah, of the Barelvi school in Diversion colony
 Jamia Masjid Ahlihadith, in Mirpur 
 Masjid e Salafiyah, in Ghatpur, a Salafi School masjid

Sports 

Sports played locally include:

Education 
The village has a literacy rate of nearly 62% according to the 2011 census. This is somewhat lower than the literacy rate of 67.16% in Jammu and Kashmir overall.

Islamic religious education 

The village of Kandoora has three Islamic educational institutions:
 Imam e Azam Institute of Islamic Studies, a Hanafi institution
 Institute of Islamic Theology and Jurisprudence
 Shah e Hamdan Institute of Islamic Studies, named in honour of Mir Sayyid Ali Hamadani

Independent schools 
 Islamic Educational Institute Kandoora (IES, Kandoora), established in 1986
This institution is the first private school in valley of the River Sukhnaag.

Post-primary schools 
 Government Girls Middle School, Kandoora: 
 The Government Boys Higher Secondary Institute, Kandoora:

Primary schools 
 Government Boys Primary School, Chanpur
 Government Boys Primary School, Malik Pur

Notes

References

External links 
 Map of Kandoora

Villages in Budgam district
Kashmir separatist movement
Kashmir conflict
Kashmiri people
Kashmiri language